Since the second half of the 20th century, inscriptions have been found on pottery in a variety of locations in China, such as Banpo near Xi'an, as well as on bone and bone marrows at Hualouzi, Chang'an County near Xi'an. These simple, often geometric, marks have been frequently compared to some of the earliest known Chinese characters appearing on the oracle bones, and some have taken them to mean that the history of Chinese writing extends back over six millennia. However, only isolated instances of these symbols have been found, and they show no indication of representing speech or of the non-pictorial processes that a writing system requires.

Nature of the symbols

At a range of Neolithic sites in China, small numbers of symbols of either pictorial or simple geometric nature have been unearthed which were incised into or drawn or painted on artifacts, mostly on pottery but in some instances on turtle shells, animal bones or artifacts made from bone or jade. These sites include those pertaining to the cultures of Yangshao, Liangzhu, Majiayao and Longshan.

There is not scholarly consensus on whether such symbols are writing, primitive or proto-writing, or merely non-writing symbols for other purposes, such as identification. Proponents of the view that they are early Chinese writing tend to see evidence in comparisons of individual signs with individual oracle bone script characters. Others believe that Neolithic signs are part of an incipient semiotic system that eventually led to the development of mature Chinese writing.

William G. Boltz of the University of Washington's Department of Asian Languages and Literature points out that such comparisons are "notoriously risky and inconclusive" when based on such primitive scratch marks rather than on similarity in function (2003, p. 38). Boltz adds:

In general, the Neolithic symbols which have been unearthed to date are found in isolated use (as would be expected with ownership marks or clan symbols) rather than in sequences consistent with representation of the spoken language, and there is no evidence of processes fundamental to the beginnings of a true, useful writing system such as phonetic loan usage. As Qiu Xigui (2000, p. 39) explains:

Only when symbols...are consciously used to record words used to form sentences is there a true sign that the development of script has begun.

Furthermore, the evidence is still extremely scanty, even when the early Shang period evidence is added to the picture:

It is still safe to conclude that the earliest known undisputed examples of true writing in China (that is, symbols used to fully record language rather than isolated meanings) are the oracle bones of the late Shang dynasty, c. 1250 BCE.

Early Neolithic
The earliest of China's Neolithic signs come from Jiahu, Dadiwan and Damaidi.

Jiahu

Jiahu is a Neolithic site in Wuyang County, Henan Province, in the basin of the Yellow River, dated to 6600–6200 BCE. This site has yielded turtle plastrons that were pitted and inscribed with markings known as the Jiahu symbols. Despite headlines proclaiming the earliest known "writing", some scholars warn that the meaningful use of such individual signs should not be easily equated with writing, although it may represent an earlier, formative stage. In the words of the archaeologists who made the latest Jiahu discovery:

Furthermore, the five-millennium gap between Jiahu and the Shang is a great distance and makes connections unlikely, as Chinese historian and paleographer Lĭ Xuéqín clearly stated, and before the discovery of much related evidence, it's hard to consider the two to be connected. Oracle bone scholar David Keightley told the BBC the similar idea:

Dadiwan

Dadiwan (5800–5400 BCE) is a Neolithic site discovered in Qin'an County, in the province of Gansu. Its earliest phase has yielded symbols painted on the inside surfaces of pottery basins. More recent excavations there have also uncovered a handful of Neolithic symbols.

Damaidi

In Damaidi, at Beishan Mountain in Ningxia, 3,172 cliff carvings dating to 6000–5000 BCE have been discovered over an area of 15 square kilometers, including a reported 8,453 different kinds of pictures like celestial bodies, gods and hunting or grazing scenes. Researchers have identified 2,000 pictorial symbols, which they said are similar to later forms of ancient characters and many can be identified as such.

Middle Neolithic

Banpo and Jiangzhai

Another group of early symbols, which many have compared to Chinese characters, are the Banpo symbols from sites like Banpo, just east of Xi'an in Shaanxi dating from the 5th millennium BCE, and nearby, at Jiangzhai, in Lintong District, from the early 4th millennium BCE. As the Banpo symbols were discovered fairly early (1954–57) and are relatively numerous (with 22 different symbols on 113 sherds), these have been the focus of the most attention.

Some scholars have concluded that they are meaningful symbols like clan emblems or signatures which have some of the quality of writing, perhaps being primitive characters, while others have concluded based on comparisons to oracle bone script that some of them are numerals. Still others feel they may be ownership mark or potters' marks.

Finally, some scholars sound a note of caution, calling such conclusions unwarranted or premature. This is because all the Banpo-type symbols occur singly, on pottery and pottery fragments, unlike written words, which tend to occur in strings representing language. Thus, there is no context from which to conclude that the symbols are actually being used to represent language. 

Furthermore, there is no evidence of the phonetic loan usage and semantic-phonetic compounding necessary to produce a functional script as seen in the Shang dynasty's oracle bone script. 

Thus, leading scholar Qiu Xigui (2000) argues that:

In Qiu's opinion, they instead more closely resemble the non-writing symbols which remained in use even into the early historical period. Another problem which has been noted is that, since the oracle bone script was fairly pictorial in nature, if one were to go back to ancestors predating them by over three millennia, one should expect an increase in the pictorial nature of the symbols, but in fact, a comparison of the majority of the Banpo symbols shows the exact opposite to be true. 

However, it is possible that some of the Banpo or other Neolithic symbols were used as numerals in a pre-literate setting. It is also plausible that when writing eventually did emerge, some such Neolithic symbols already in use (and not necessarily from such an early site as Banpo) were absorbed into that writing system.

Other discoveries

Symbols unearthed in 1992 at Shuangdun in Bengbu, Anhui province are said to include composite signs.

Late Neolithic

Dawenkou

Inscription-bearing artifacts from the Dawenkou culture in Shandong, dating to c. 2800–2500 BCE, have also been unearthed since excavations started in the 1950s, and have drawn a great deal of interest amongst researchers, in part because the Dawenkou culture is believed by some to be ancestral to the Longshan culture, which in turn is thought ancestral to the Shang, where the first undisputed Chinese writing appears. At a Dawenkou site in Shandong, one pictorial symbol has been found painted in cinnabar, while at the Dawenkou sites by the Língyáng River and in Dàzhū Village, eighteen isolated pictorial symbols of eight types incised and/or painted with cinnabar on sixteen pottery jars and shards have been found, mostly from wealthier tombs. Some resemble axes, and another has been variously described as resembling the sun above a cloud or fire , while a third type has the latter above a fire or mountain-like element.

In addition to the similarity in style between these and pictographic Shang and early Zhou clan symbols, what is important about the latter two types is that they have multiple components, reminiscent of the compounding of elements in the Chinese script, thus eliciting claims of a relationship. Yu Xingwu identified the circle-and-cloud graph as the Chinese character for "dawn", 旦 dàn, while Táng Lán identified it as "bright", 炅 jiǒng, and so on. Helping fuel speculation of a link between Dawenkou symbols and Shang writing is their somewhat greater proximity in time (1400 years distance) and space to the Shang oracle bones, compared to earlier Neolithic finds; furthermore, the Shandong Dawenkou culture is thought by some to be ancestral to Shandong Longshan culture, which in turn may have given rise to early Shang culture.

As with each of the other Neolithic sites, the comparison is based on only a handful of isolated pictures, and there is again no evidence of use in strings of symbols such as we would expect with true writing – none of these appear jointly. Wáng Níngshēng thus concluded that they are marks of personal or clan identity rather than writing. According to Wáng, "True writing begins when it represents sounds and consists of symbols that are able to record language. The few isolated figures found on pottery still cannot substantiate this point." Keightley opines that "they probably served as emblems of ownership or identity on these pots and jades, rather than as words in a writing system". Boltz agrees that they may have been "the pre-Shang counterpart to the Shang clan-name insignia" (p. 48), but contrasts this with an actual writing system, for which there isn't any evidence at that time (p. 51–52), while Qiu concludes:

Longshan culture

The Chengziya site in Longshan, Shandong has produced fragments of inscribed bones presumably used to divine the future, dating to 2500–1900 BC, and symbols on pottery vessels from Dinggong are thought by some scholars to be an early form of writing. Again, this is controversial. Symbols of a similar nature have also been found on pottery sherds from the Liangzhu culture of the lower Yangtze valley.

A pottery inscription of the Longshan culture discovered in Dinggong Village, Zouping County, Shandong contains eleven symbols that do not look like the direct ancestor of Chinese characters. Chinese scholar Feng Shi (馮時) argued in 1994 that this inscription can be interpreted as written by the Longshan people. Other scholars, like Ming Ru, are doubtful about attributing a Neolithic date to the inscription. The authenticity of these inscriptions is hotly disputed due to their appearance on a broken ceramic ware, an unusual feature among prehistorical text, as well as its unexpected similar appearance with the Yi script, a modern writing system associated with an ethnic group in the southwestern China, thousands of miles and thousands of years apart from the Longshan culture in northern China.

Possible Liangzhu symbols

There are also some items, including some inscribed jades, which have symbols similar to or identical to several of the Dawenkou pictures, such as the circle and peaked crescent motif  , and another described as a bird perched on a mountain-like shape; it appears that some of these may belong to the Liangzhu culture.

Between 2003 and 2006, over 240 pieces of artifacts containing ancient symbols used by the 5000-year-old Liangzhu culture were unearthed within the Zhuangqiaofen ruin in Lindai town, Pinghu city, Zhejiang province. The letters were determined to be 1000 years before the Anyang Chinese script. However, the discovery did not conclude whether it was a precursor of the Anyang script. The discovered Liangzhu script were determined by academics as symbols rather than proper language.

Other discoveries

A few geometric symbols have been found at Hūalóuzĭ (a 2nd-phase Kèshĕngzhuāng culture site) in Chang'an County near Xi'an, carved on bone and bone items which some have claimed to be ancestral to oracle bones, but this is disputed.  In western Guangxi, late neolithic and bronze age artifacts have been uncovered bearing a set of symbols- dubbed Sawveh or 'etched script' in the Zhuang language- which may be a form of proto-writing (see Sawgoek), however this is also disputed due to lack of clear evidence.

Notes

References

Literature 

 Boltz, William G. (1994; revised 2003). The Origin and Early Development of the Chinese Writing System. American Oriental Series, vol. 78. American Oriental Society, New Haven, Connecticut, USA. .
 Demattè, Paola (2010). The Origins of Chinese Writing: the Neolithic Evidence. Cambridge Archaeological Journal, 20, pp 211–228. doi:10.1017/S0959774310000247. 
 Gāo Míng 高明 (1987). “中國古文字通論” (A General Survey of Ancient Chinese Script), Bĕijīng: 文物出版社 Wénwù Chūbǎnshè (in Chinese)
 Guo Moruo (1972). 古代文字之辯證的發展. in 考古 Kǎogǔ v.3, pp. 2–13.
 Kaogu (1965). 河南偃師二里頭遺址發掘簡報 (Excavation of the Èrlĭtóu Sites at Yǎnshī, Hénán), v.5, p. 215–224. (in Chinese)
 Keightley, David. N. (1989). The Origins of Writing in China: Scripts and Cultural Contexts. In Senner, Wayne M. (1989). The Origins of Writing. Lincoln: University of Nebraska Press; : pp. 171–202.
 Li Xueqin 李學勤 (1985). 考古發現與中國文字起源 (Archaeological Discoveries and the Origins of Chinese Writing), in 中國文化研究集刊 Zhōnggúo wénhùa yánjiū jíkān 2; Shànghǎi: Fúdàn Dàxué Chūbǎnshè, pp. 146–157 (in Chinese).
 Lĭ Xuéqín 李學勤 (2000). “百年甲骨話滄桑” (Talking about the One Hundred Years of the Oracle Bones), Shànghǎi: 上海科技教育出版社 Shànghǎi Kējì Jiàoyù Chūbǎnshè (in Chinese) 
 Qiu Xigui 裘錫圭 (2000). Chinese Writing. English translation of 文字學概論 by Gilbert L. Mattos and Jerry Norman. Early China Special Monograph Series No. 4. Berkeley: The Society for the Study of Early China and the Institute of East Asian Studies, University of California, Berkeley. .
 Táng Lán 唐蘭 (1975). 關於江西吳城文化遺址與文字的初步探索 (A Preliminary Investigation of the Script on the Ancient Cultural Remains at Wúchéng, Jiāngxī), in Wénwù (Cultural Relics) v.7, pp. 72–76 (in Chinese)
 Wāng Níngshēng 汪寧生 (1981). 從原始記事到文字發明 (From Primitive Record-keeping to the Invention of Writing), 考古學報 Kǎogǔ Xuébào, v.1, p. 42 (in Chinese)
 Wénwù zīliào cóngkān (文物資料叢刊) (1978). 江西清江吳城商代遺址第四次發掘的主要收穫 (The Main Results of the Excavation of Shāng Period Pit #4 at 吳城 Wúchéng in Qīngjiāng, Jiāngxī. 2.1–13 (in Chinese).
 Woon, Wee Lee 雲惟利 (1987). Chinese Writing: Its Origin and Evolution (in English; Chinese title 漢字的原始和演變). Originally published by the Univ. of East Asia, Macau; now by Joint Publishing, Hong Kong.
 Yú Xĭngwú 于省吾 (1973) 關於古文字研究的若干問題 (Some Problems Pertaining to the Study of Ancient Chinese Writing), in Wénwù (Cultural Relics) v.2, pp. 32–35 (in Chinese).
 Zhèng Hóngchūn 鄭洪春 & Mù Hǎitíng 穆海亭 (1988) 陜西長安花樓子客省莊二期文化遺址發掘 (Excavation of the Period-Two Ancient Cultural Remains at Hūalóuzĭ in Cháng’ān, Shaǎnxī), Kǎogǔ yǔ Wénwù 5–6, pp. 229–239 (in Chinese).

Chinese characters
Neolithic China
Chinese scripts
Proto-writing